Aks Swadhin (born 14 October 2002) is a Bangladeshi cricketer. He made his Twenty20 debut on 9 June 2021, for Abahani Limited in the 2021 Dhaka Premier Division Twenty20 Cricket League. He made his first-class debut on 7 November 2021, for Dhaka Metropolis in the 2021–22 National Cricket League. He made his List A debut on 11 January 2022, for North Zone in the 2021–22 Bangladesh Cricket League One Day tournament.

References

External links
 

2002 births
Living people
Bangladeshi cricketers
Place of birth missing (living people)
Abahani Limited cricketers
Dhaka Metropolis cricketers